Jonathan M. Lewis (born July 12, 1984) is a former American football defensive tackle. He was drafted by the Arizona Cardinals in the sixth round of the 2006 NFL Draft. He played college football at Virginia Tech.

Lewis was also a member of the Oakland Raiders, Seattle Seahawks, Detroit Lions, Jacksonville Jaguars, Cleveland Browns and Virginia Destroyers.

References

External links

Just Sports Stats
Jacksonville Jaguars bio
Virginia Tech Hokies bio

1984 births
Living people
Players of American football from Richmond, Virginia
American football defensive tackles
Virginia Tech Hokies football players
Arizona Cardinals players
Oakland Raiders players
Seattle Seahawks players
Detroit Lions players
Jacksonville Jaguars players
Cleveland Browns players
Virginia Destroyers players